"Que Se Mueran" (English: "Let Them Die") is a song by American singer Romeo Santos. It is a song from his first studio album Formula, Vol. 1 (2011).

Chart performance

Certifications

References

2011 songs
Romeo Santos songs
Songs written by Romeo Santos
Spanish-language songs